Bassingbourn is a village in Cambridgeshire, England.

Bassingbourn may also refer to:

 RAF Bassingbourn, a former airfield in Cambridgeshire, England
 Bassingbourn Barracks, an army base on the site of the airfield

See also 
 Bassingbourne Gawdy (disambiguation)